Saom Vansodany (c. 1947 – c. 1977) or Som Van Sok Dany was a famous Cambodian actress from the late 1960s until 1975. She was mainly featured and famous for her roles in melodramatic movies such as Thavory Meas Bong and Sovannahong. She married fellow actor, Chea Yuthorn before the communist era. Details of her life are relatively unknown and she is believed to have perished from overwork under the Khmer Rouge regime shortly after giving birth to her son, Thorn Tharith.

References 

 
 Gender-Based Violence During the Khmer Rouge Regime
Stories of survivors from the Democratic Kampuchea (1975-1979)
Nakagawa Kasumi March 2008 page-26
http://menengage.org/wp-content/uploads/2014/06/Kasumi_GBV_Study_2007.pdf

Cambodian film actresses
20th-century Cambodian actresses
Year of birth missing
People who died in the Cambodian genocide
Deaths in childbirth
Executed Cambodian women